The Australian Training Awards are the peak national awards for the vocational education and training (VET) sector, recognising organisations, registered training organisations and individuals for their contribution to skilling Australia.

There are 18 Australian Training Award categories. A majority of categories articulate from the state or territory training awards with the remainder available by direct entry to the Australian Training Awards.

Award Categories

Organisations 
Small Employer of the Year Award 
Medium Employer of the Year Award 
Employer of the Year Award 
Small Training Provider of the Year Award  
Large Training Provider of the Year Award
Industry Collaboration Award 
International Training Provider of the Year Award 
Australian Apprenticeships - Employer Award
School Pathways to VET Award

Individuals 
Australian School-based Apprentice of the Year Award  
Vocational Student of the Year Award 
Aboriginal and Torres Strait Islander Student of the Year Award 
Australian Apprentice (Trainee) of the Year Award
Australian Apprentice of the Year Award
VET Teacher/Trainer of the Year Award
Excellence in Language, Literacy and Numeracy Practice Award
National Achievement Award
Lifetime Achievement Award

External links 
Australian Training Awards website
Aboriginal and Torrens Strait Islander Student of the year

Training
Business and industry awards